Nigel Nicholson  is a British business psychologist and Emeritus Professor of Organisational Behaviour at London Business School. He is known for his work advocating the application of evolutionary psychology to business management.

References

External links
Faculty page

Organizational psychologists
British psychologists
Living people
Alumni of Cardiff University
Alumni of the University of Wales
Academics of London Business School
Management scientists
Evolutionary psychologists
Fellows of the British Psychological Society
Year of birth missing (living people)